There are a total of seventeen bobsleigh, luge, and skeleton tracks around the world in use for competitions in winter bobsleigh, luge, and skeleton, including the Yanqing track in China built to host the 2022 Winter Olympics. All of the current tracks on this list except St. Moritz, Switzerland, which is naturally refrigerated, are constructed of reinforced concrete and use artificial refrigeration to cool the track down prior to its run.

Artificial tracks

Current tracks

Planned tracks

Former tracks

Natural luge tracks
Please see List of natural luge tracks

These are tracks adapted from existing mountain roads and paths. Artificial banking and refrigeration are prohibited.

References

External links
FIBT.com list of artificial bobsleigh and skeleton tracks
FIL-Luge.org list of artificial luge tracks
FIL-Luge.org list of natural luge tracks

Tracks

Bobsleigh, luge, and skeleton tracks
Tracks
Tracks